USS Clamp (ARS-33) was an  acquired by the U.S. Navy during World War II. Her task was to come to the aid of stricken vessels.

Clamp was launched on 24 October 1942 by Basalt Rock Company in Napa, California, under a Maritime Commission contract. The vessel was commissioned on 23 August 1943.

World War II service 

Clamp sailed from San Pedro, California, 30 September 1943 and after a brief period at Pearl Harbor, arrived at Funafuti, Ellice Islands, 8 November. From this base she conducted combat salvage operations supporting the Gilbert Islands invasion.

Under constant attack 

On 10 November Clamp had a busy day as she came under air attack five different times. The enemy was driven off and Clamp sustained no damage.

Capturing Japanese prisoners 

Clamp began working in the Marshalls on salvage and cargo duty in April 1944. She investigated sunken Japanese vessels for salvage value off Saipan in July, capturing 10 prisoners during this work. She also salvaged LST-34 aground off Tinian, in August, returning to Pearl Harbor for overhaul in November.

Iwo Jima and Okinawa operations 

Clamp arrived at Iwo Jima 19 February 1945 and until 2 March was engaged in salvage work during the invasion and capture of that island. Sailing to Leyte via Saipan, Guam, and Ulithi, she joined the salvage and repair group which cleared 21 March for the invasion of Okinawa. Based at Kerama Retto from 26 March to 15 May, Clamp gave emergency aid to the cruiser , a kamikaze victim, from 31 March to 5 April. She steamed to Ie Shima 12 May to inspect damage to two destroyers.

Support nuclear testing operations 

Clamp was overhauled on the west coast until 5 November 1945 when she sailed for Pearl Harbor. She remained there until 6 March 1946, put out for Bikini Atoll where she had towing, diving, and demolition duties in connection with Operation Crossroads. She returned to Pearl Harbor 16 September, and to San Francisco, California, 22 October.

Post-war decommissioning 

Clamp was placed out of commission in reserve at San Pedro, California, 6 May 1947. Clamp was struck from the Naval Vessel Register, 1 July 1973 and her title transfer to MARAD, 1 February 1999. On 12 April 2011, a contract was issued by MARAD to Marine Metals of Brownsville, Texas to dismantle Clamp for $462,223.31. Clamp departed the Suisun Bay Reserve Fleet on 23 May 2011 to be cleaned at BAE Systems San Francisco Ship Repair. Clamp was towed to Brownsville upon completion of the cleaning and is currently undergoing scrapping.

Military awards and honors 

Clamp received four battle stars for World War II service. Her crew was eligible for the following medals and ribbons:
 Combat Action Ribbon (retroactive)
 American Campaign Medal
 Asiatic-Pacific Campaign Medal (4)
 World War II Victory Medal

Current status
, Clamp is laid up in the National Defense Reserve Fleet in Suisun Bay, Benicia, California. Clamp was mentioned in a newspaper article published on 11 February 2008 concerning the status of sister ship .

References

External links 
 
 Basalt Rock Company Shipbuilding History

Diver-class rescue and salvage ships
Ships built in Napa, California
World War II auxiliary ships of the United States
1942 ships